Aeolia is the second demo by Norwegian progressive metal band Leprous, released in 2006. It was recorded and mixed at Symfonique and Juke Joint Studio by Mnemosyne. Art Design by Bjørn Tore Moen. Although a self-released demo, it is occasionally regarded as the band's first full-length album due to the running time being longer than that of most other Leprous recordings.

Track listing

Personnel 
 Einar Solberg – synth, vocals
 Tor Oddmund Suhrke – guitar, vocals
 Øystein Landsverk – guitar, backing vocals
 Halvor Strand – bass
 Tor Stian Borhaug – drums

References 

2006 albums
Demo albums
Leprous albums
Self-released albums